The black pika or silver pika (Ochotona nigritia) is a species of mammal in the family Ochotonidae. It was thought to be common to the Yunnan Province of China where it was first discovered in 2000, it is only known from four specimens. The validity of the species has been questioned, with some studies suggesting that the known specimens represent melanistic individuals of Forrest's pika (Ochotona forresti).

Subsequently, in 2011, a WWF-India team on an expedition to West Kameng, India reported sighting two black pikas at an altitude of 13,000 ft in the Thembang Bapu community-conserved forest area.

It is rarely found, one of the six pika species endemic to central China, with no true population studies.

References

Notes

Bibliography

Mammals described in 2000
Taxobox binomials not recognized by IUCN